An animal tattoo or pet tattoo is a tattoo that a person has placed on an animal, which may be for animal identification, aesthetics, or artistic purposes. Animal identification via tattoo is a practice within the agricultural industry, at breeding farms, in scientific laboratories, and in the identification of domesticated pets. Anaesthetic or other methods of sedation are commonly administered for this type of procedure, with the aim to provide minimal harm and pain to the animal. There is a diversity of opinion concerning the morality of animal tattooing, related to concerns about animal welfare.



History 
Animal tattooing can be traced back to 2,000 B.C., where Egyptians marked their cattle with tattoos to prevent theft. These tattoos signified ownership of cattle and were recurrently seen in early historical records. Cattle tattooing became widespread in the 16th century, when Spanish explorers brought cattle to North America. It was common for these tattoos to be the owner’s initials or the name of their ranch, as a symbol of ownership as well as identification.

There is also evidence of animal tattooing in the first half of the twentieth century, utilised by the military. A newspaper article from 1910 outlined that it was common for the military to tattoo identification numbers onto horse’s hooves, as armies were still operating on horsepower. However, these markings only lasted for approximately four months. Due to this, the British Army began tattooing identification numbers and letters onto the inside of horse’s lips; this eventually became a common technique among military units.

Animal identification 
The most common use of animal tattooing is for animal identification purposes.

Agriculture 
Animal identification is essential in the agricultural industry, due to its aid in identity confirmation, breeding security and theft prevention. Within the realm of livestock production, animal identification aids producers in the documentation of areas such as reproduction, health issues, milk production and medical procedures.

The method of tattooing identification codes on animals is very complex and specific and is commonly taught very early in agricultural training. There are several different procedures associated with animal identification tattooing; the appropriate procedure is determined through examining the size of the animal, the size of the herd or the various purposes for identification. 

Animal identification can either be permanent or non-permanent. Examples of non-permanent animal identification are paint and chalk, whereas tattooing and ear tags are examples of permanent identification. For dairy cattle, beef cattle and goats, tattoos are usually done on the ears. Cats and dogs are usually tattooed either on the ear or stomach, whereas horses are commonly tattooed inside of their lips. The cattle tattooing procedure requires numbers or letters made of sharp needles, rubbing alcohol, tattoo ink, gloves and pliers. 

To ensure hygiene and decrease the risk of spreading infection throughout a herd, all tattoo equipment used must be sanitised after use. Several weeks after the tattoo is executed, the ink will dry and flake, leaving a legible permanent identification.

Pets 

For domesticated pets, tattooing is not recommended as the primary identification procedure. This is because tattooing animals requires heavy sedation as well as specific disinfected equipment for every procedure. Tattoos on domesticated pets are likely to become superfluous due to hair growth and fading over time. There are also no specific guidelines for the placement of identification tattoos on domesticated animals, so it may be hard to detect the whereabouts or existence of an identification tattoo on these animals. For dogs and cats, the primary recommended form of identification is a collar as it is non-intrusive and has a high success rate of reunification with owners when lost. However, identification tattoos can also be beneficial as they are argued to be more reliable and permanent than a collar or microchip.

Identification tattoos are also commonly used by breeders to maintain accurate documentation of their kennel, and for veterinarians or animal rescue organisations to signify whether or not a rescued animal has been spayed. 

It is common for veterinarians and breeders to use an electric tattoo machine to tattoo animals, but sometimes manual hand tattooing is utilised instead. When using an electric tattoo machine, veterinarians and breeders typically put animals under anaesthesia prior to the procedure in order to inflict minimal pain.

Biomedical 
In the biomedical industry, animal identification is important for experimental subjects in a laboratory, predominantly rats; tattoos are used to ensure that no domesticated companion animals are accidentally in a research lab.

Art and aesthetics 

Tattoo artist Bob Shaw stated that in middle of the 20th century, himself, as well as many other tattoo artists, used to tattoo the pink marks on dogs’ noses to make them appear completely black for either aesthetic reasons, or to avoid sunburn. Shaw reported that many of his friends that were performing these types of tattoos had black marks on their hands, from the dogs jumping from pain. These tattoo procedures were performed at the veterinary clinic, and dogs were administered a small amount of anaesthetic to avoid great pain.

Wim Delvoye (b.1965) has an artistic and conceptual practice involving the tattooing of live pigs, which he began in 1997. Delvoye is known for tattooing 'pop culture' symbols directly onto live pigs, which he then exhibits them in galleries or on his Art Farm. This has provoked debate about the morality of this art form.

An example of tattooing animals for decorative means occurred in Detroit in 2007, where at least seven pet shops in the metro area sold tattooed Parrot Cichlid fish for Valentine’s Day. These fish were tattooed with pink lips and the text ‘I (heart) U’ on their bodies. An injection or a laser was used on the fish in order to imprint a permanent design. This was therefore administered purely for aesthetic means, which provoked disappointment from animal rights activists.

Ethical implications 
The discourse surrounding the treatment of animals dates back to ancient religious texts; Eastern religions such as Buddhism and Hinduism abandoned the concept of animal sacrifice in their biblical texts, as Eastern philosophy believes in non-violence to all living beings. In the Islamic religion, adherents are taught that Allah has granted humans with power over animals, however, bad treatment of animals is wholly forbidden.

The philosophy of animal welfare implies that humans have the power or right over animals, and are therefore responsible for their well-being. The concept of 'animal well-being' accounts for an animal's stress, suffering, physical health and behavioural needs. However, this dominion that humans possess over animals has provoked conflicted attitudes toward the practice of pet tattooing; although people assert that tattooing animals can evoke harm and pain upon the animal, others believe that it is within their rights as an owner. This 'dominion over animals' is a Judeo-Christian concept, and explains the complex relationship between humankind and animals. The major world religions have therefore had great impact on societal attitudes toward the treatment of animals, where non-violence to all living creatures is a commonly shared philosophy among the majority of major religions.

References

Tattooing
Pets